"Hold On (Shut Up)" is a song by American hip hop recording artist Machine Gun Kelly. The song, released on August 6, 2012, serves as the third single from his debut studio album Lace Up. The single features vocals from American rapper Young Jeezy and was produced by JP Did This 1.

Background
The song was officially released through a mixtape by DJ Clue, called Desert Storm Radio: The Takeover, which was released on August 6, 2012. It was later included on Kelly's mixtape "EST 4 Life" (featuring DUBO), which was released on August 13, 2012. On August 7, 2012, MGK announced in a Ustream session that the song would be the third single for his upcoming album, Lace Up.

Music video
The official music video was released on November 19, 2012.

Track listing
Digital single

Credits and personnel
Songwriter – Richard Baker, Jay Jenkins
Production – JP Did This 1
Recording engineer - Brian White

Charts

Release history

References

External links

2012 singles
2012 songs
Machine Gun Kelly (musician) songs
Jeezy songs
Bad Boy Records singles
Interscope Records singles
Songs written by Machine Gun Kelly (musician)
Songs written by Jeezy